Smith Center is a city in and the county seat of Smith County, Kansas, United States.  As of the 2020 census, the population of the city was 1,571.

History
Smith Center was founded in 1871. The first post office in Smith Center was established in January 1873. Like Smith County, Smith Center was named for Maj. J. Nelson Smith of the 2nd Colorado Cavalry, a pre-war native of Elwood, Kansas, who died leading his regiment on October 21, 1864 at the Battle of the Little Blue River.

Geography
Smith Center is located at  (39.778550, -98.785141).

Smith Center is located at the junction of U.S. Routes 281 and 36, approximately 100 miles south of Grand Island, Nebraska and 77 miles north of Russell and Interstate 70.

Climate

Demographics

2010 census
As of the census of 2010, there were 1,665 people, 779 households, and 470 families living in the city. The racial makeup of the city was 97.7% White, 0.1% African American, 0.4% Native American, 0.1% Asian, 0.2% Pacific Islander, 0.4% from other races, and 1.1% from two or more races. Hispanic or Latino of any race were 1.0% of the population.

There were 779 households, of which 23.2% had children under the age of 18 living with them, 49.8% were married couples living together, 7.1% had a female householder with no husband present, 3.5% had a male householder with no wife present, and 39.7% were non-families. 36.8% of all households were made up of individuals, and 21.1% had someone living alone who was 65 years of age or older. The average household size was 2.10 and the average family size was 2.71.

The median age in the city was 48.7 years. 20.6% of residents were under the age of 18; 5.4% were between the ages of 18 and 24; 18% were from 25 to 44; 26.8% were from 45 to 64; and 28.9% were 65 years of age or older. The gender makeup of the city was 47.2% male and 52.8% female.

2000 census
As of the census of 2000, there were 1,931 people, 852 households, and 534 families living in the city. The racial makeup of the city was 99.17% White, 0.21% Native American, 0.26% Pacific Islander, 0.10% from other races, and 0.26% from two or more races. Hispanic or Latino of any race were 0.47% of the population.

There were 852 households, out of which 24.2% had children under the age of 18 living with them, 54.0% were married couples living together, 6.1% had a female householder with no husband present, and 37.3% were non-families. 34.4% of all households were made up of individuals, and 21.9% had someone living alone who was 65 years of age or older. The average household size was 2.17 and the average family size was 2.77.

In the city, the age distribution of the population shows 21.0% under the age of 18, 4.7% from 18 to 24, 21.7% from 25 to 44, 20.5% from 45 to 64, and 32.1% who were 65 years of age or older. The median age was 47 years. For every 100 females, there were 84.3 males. For every 100 females age 18 and over, there were 79.2 males.

The median income for a household in the city was $26,857, and the median income for a family was $36,316. Males had a median income of $25,833 versus $20,667 for females. The per capita income for the city was $15,500. About 8.7% of families and 10.7% of the population were below the poverty line, including 14.0% of those under age 18 and 12.5% of those age 65 or over.

Government
The Smith Center government consists of a mayor and five council members.
 City Hall, 119 West Court Street.

Education

Primary and secondary education
Smith Center is part of Unified School District 237.  The district has two schools in Smith Center:
 Smith Center Junior/Senior High School, 300 Roger Barta Way, Grades 7 to 12.
 Smith Center Elementary School, 216 South Jefferson Street, Grades K to 6.

Notable people
 Roscoe "Fatty" Arbuckle, silent film star
 Nolan Cromwell, NFL defensive back for the Los Angeles Rams
 Mitch Holthus, radio announcer for the Kansas City Chiefs
 Mark Simoneau, College Football Hall of Fame linebacker for Kansas State University; played in the National Football League (NFL) for the Atlanta Falcons, Philadelphia Eagles, New Orleans Saints and Kansas City Chiefs
 Steve Tasker, NFL wide receiver for the Buffalo Bills
 Albert F. "Jud" Wagner, Kansas' last confirmed World War I veteran
 Evelyn Wilson, Justice of the Kansas Supreme Court

References

Further reading

External links

 City of Smith Center
 Smith Center - Directory of Public Officials
 USD 237, local school district
 , from Hatteberg's People on KAKE TV news
 Historic Images - Wichita State University Libraries
 Smith Center city map, KDOT

Cities in Smith County, Kansas
Cities in Kansas
County seats in Kansas
Populated places established in 1871
1871 establishments in Kansas